The 2018–19 Calgary Flames season was the Flames' 39th season in Calgary, and the 47th for the National Hockey League franchise that was established on June 6, 1972.

The Flames clinched a playoff spot on March 17, 2019, when the Minnesota Wild lost to the New York Islanders. On March 31, the team won its first division title since the 2005–06 season, and clinched the best record in what is now the Western Conference for the first time since the 1989–90 season. They also finished with 50 wins and 107 points, in both cases trailing only the 1989 Stanley Cup champions. The Flames faced the Colorado Avalanche in the first round, losing in five games.

Standings

Schedule and results

Preseason
The preseason schedule was published on June 14, 2018.

Regular season
The regular season schedule was released on June 21, 2018.

Playoffs

The Flames faced the Colorado Avalanche in the First Round of the playoffs. and were defeated in five games.

Player statistics
As of April 19, 2019

Skaters

Goaltenders

†Denotes player spent time with another team before joining the Flames. Stats reflect time with the Flames only.
‡Denotes player was traded mid-season. Stats reflect time with the Flames only.
Bold/italics denotes franchise record.

Transactions

Player signings

Trades

Additions and subtractions

Draft picks

Below are the Calgary Flames' selections at the 2018 NHL Entry Draft, which was held on June 22 and 23, 2018, at the American Airlines Center in Dallas, Texas.

Notes:
 The Florida Panthers' fourth-round pick went to the Calgary Flames as the result of a trade on February 27, 2016, that sent Jiri Hudler to Florida in exchange for a second-round pick in 2016 and this pick.
 The Winnipeg Jets' fourth-round pick went to the Calgary Flames as the result of a trade on June 23, 2018, that sent a fourth-round pick in 2019 to Montreal in exchange for this pick.

References

Calgary Flames seasons
Calgary Flames
Flames